Arsène Né (born 4 January 1981 in Abidjan) is an Ivorian footballer. He is a central defender and last played for the Belgian club Hasselt. He previously played for several other clubs, including Beveren, Metalurh Donetsk and Germinal Beerschot.

References

1981 births
Living people
Ivorian footballers
Ivorian expatriate footballers
ASEC Mimosas players
FC Metalurh Donetsk players
Beerschot A.C. players
K.S.K. Beveren players
K.A.S. Eupen players
Challenger Pro League players
Belgian Pro League players
Ukrainian Premier League players
Expatriate footballers in Belgium
Expatriate footballers in Ukraine
Ivorian expatriate sportspeople in Ukraine
Footballers from Abidjan
Association football defenders